Pierre Brüno Dagenais (born March 4, 1978) is a Canadian former professional ice hockey player who most notably played in the National Hockey League (NHL). He last played for the Akwesasne Warriors of the Federal Hockey League.

Playing career

Amateur
As a youth, Dagenais played in the 1991 Quebec International Pee-Wee Hockey Tournament with a minor ice hockey team from Mille-Îles in Laval, Quebec.

Dagenais began his junior career after being drafted by the Moncton Alpines of the Quebec Major Junior Hockey League (QMJHL) when he was 17 years old. He quickly became a young star on his team, leading the team in points and goals in his rookie campaign in the 1995-96 season. Dagenais was drafted 47th overall in the 1996 NHL Entry Draft by the New Jersey Devils, but remained in the QMJHL.

Six games into the following season, Dagenais was traded to the Laval Titan for Mathieu Letourneau. At mid-season he was traded to the Rouyn-Noranda Huskies for Yanick Hubert and Jean-Philippe Soucy.

In the 1997–98 season, Dagenais led the QMJHL in goals and was second in points. That year Dagenais met Mike Ribeiro, who finished second in points after Pierre.  Ribeiro and Dagenais developed a great friendship while playing on the same line throughout the entire season.

In the summer of 1998, Dagenais was once again draft eligible as he had not signed a contract with the Devils, he was then re-drafted by New Jersey with the 105th overall pick in the 1998 NHL Entry Draft.

Professional
The 1998–99 season was Dagenais' professional hockey debut. He played with the New Jersey Devils' AHL affiliate, the Albany River Rats. The 1999–00 season was better than his first professional season. He finished among the top scorers in the league with 35 goals.

In 2000–01 season Dagenais was selected to the AHL's second all-star team. He also was called up by the New Jersey Devils and played his first NHL games. 
In the 2001–02 season he played 16 games with the Devils. He was placed on waivers by New Jersey and claimed by the Florida Panthers. He spent the majority of the remaining season playing for the Panthers. After next year's training camp, he was sent to the Panthers' AHL team, the San Antonio Rampage.

During the summer 2003, the Montreal Canadiens' general manager Bob Gainey surprised some by signing Dagenais to a one-year contract. Dagenais started the 2003–04 season with the Canadiens' AHL affiliate, the Hamilton Bulldogs. He played 50 games on the Habs' second line with Mike Ribeiro and Michael Ryder. The line was the most productive of the team and Dagenais scored 27 points.

During the 2004–05 NHL lockout, Dagenais played 7 games with HC Ajoie in Switzerland. He was also involved in a controversy during the lockout. In an interview, Dagenais stated he wouldn't mind playing under a salary cap, which was in opposition to the NHLPA's stance. In his return to the NHL in 2005–06, Dagenais scored the first game-winning shootout goal in Montreal for the Canadiens on November 22, 2005. With dwindling offensive numbers he was sent back to the Hamilton Bulldogs in January. He became a restricted free agent during the summer of 2006, and signed a tryout contract with Jokerit in the Finnish SM-liiga in October 2006. His tryout lasted until the SM-liiga Christmas break, and the contract was not renewed.  He signed a new contract with Austrian team, HC TWK Innsbruck of the Erste Bank Eishockey Liga and had an excellent 2006–07 season, scoring 37 goals in only 27 games. He almost led the league in goals, despite playing only half the year. He re-signed with Innsbruck for 2007–08 season.

In 2008, he signed with Kontinental Hockey League club, Traktor Chelyabinsk. After potting 14 goals in 40 games in 2008–09, Pierre was re-signed to a one-year contract extension on August 5, 2009.

In 2010, he signed with the Akwesasne Warriors of the Federal Hockey League. Being one of a few Federal League players with NHL experience, Dagenais was able to score on a regular basis. At the time of his departure, he had played 23 games and scored 26 goals and 54 points and still had a share of the scoring lead a month after his departure from the team.

On December 5, Dagenais was listed on the Federal League's site as being recalled to Oslo Elite, a third division team in Austria. The news was reported the following day on ATSE Graz's website. Despite signing a contract, Dagenais said he would not be reporting to ATSE Graz.

On 5 January 2011, Dagenais signed a contract with Norwegian team Vålerenga of the GET-ligaen.

Dagenais now works in real estate in the Montreal area.

Career statistics

References

External links

1978 births
Akwesasne Warriors players
Albany River Rats players
Canadian ice hockey forwards
Florida Panthers players
Hamilton Bulldogs (AHL) players
Ice hockey people from Quebec
HC TWK Innsbruck players
Jokerit players
Laval Titan Collège Français players
Living people
Moncton Alpines (QMJHL) players
Moncton Wildcats players
Montreal Canadiens players
New Jersey Devils draft picks
New Jersey Devils players
People from Blainville, Quebec
Rouyn-Noranda Huskies players
San Antonio Rampage players
Traktor Chelyabinsk players
Utah Grizzlies (AHL) players
Vålerenga Ishockey players
Canadian expatriate ice hockey players in Austria
Canadian expatriate ice hockey players in Norway
Canadian expatriate ice hockey players in Finland
Canadian expatriate ice hockey players in Russia